Wilson Alexander Sutherland (26 September 1935 – 7 October 2019) was a British mathematician at the University of Oxford.

Sutherland earned a doctorate at the University of Oxford in 1963 under the joint supervision of J. H. C. Whitehead and Ioan James, with a dissertation in algebraic topology.
He was, for many years, a lecturer in mathematics at Oxford, and a mathematics tutor at New College. He also taught at the Massachusetts Institute of Technology and the University of Manchester, and, as a visiting professor, at Yale University and the University of Aberdeen.

Sutherland died at his home in Cumbria on 7 October 2019 at the age of 84.

Publications
  2nd edition, 2009,

References 

2019 deaths
Fellows of New College, Oxford
20th-century British mathematicians
1935 births
21st-century British mathematicians
Alumni of the University of St Andrews
Alumni of the University of Oxford
Topologists
Academics of the University of Manchester
People from Forres